Makednoi is a municipal unit of Kastoria municipality in the Kastoria regional unit, Western Macedonia, Greece. Until the 2011 local government reform it was a separate municipality. The municipal unit has an area of 37.614 km2, and a population of 3,220 (2011). The seat of the former municipality was in Mavrochori.

Name
The name is derived from the Ancient Greek name meaning "Macedonian", Makednos (Μακεδνός). Whereas in Greek the municipal unit is referred to as Dimotiki Enotita Makednon (Δημοτική Ενότητα Μακεδνών), using the genitive plural form of the ancient name, Makednoi is the nominative plural form ("Macedonians"). In English, the names Makednon, Makednoi, Makednos and Makednes are occasionally used.

Settlements 
The settlements of the municipal unit are:

 Dispilio
 Krepeni
 Mavrochori
 Polykarpi

References

External links
Official website

Former municipalities in Western Macedonia
Populated places in Kastoria (regional unit)